Barbara Meyer (born 24 March 1982) is an Austrian racing cyclist. She rode in the women's time trial event at the 2018 UCI Road World Championships.

References

External links
 

1982 births
Living people
Austrian female cyclists
Place of birth missing (living people)
21st-century Austrian women